Narration is the use of a written or spoken commentary to convey a story to an audience. Narration is conveyed by a narrator: a specific person, or unspecified literary voice, developed by the creator of the story to deliver information to the audience, particularly about the plot: the series of events. Narration is a required element of all written stories (novels, short stories, poems, memoirs, etc.), presenting the story in its entirety. However, narration is merely optional in most other storytelling formats, such as films, plays, television shows, and video games, in which the story can be conveyed through other means, like dialogue between characters or visual action.

The narrative mode encompasses the set of choices through which the creator of the story develops their narrator and narration:
 Narrative point of view, perspective, or voice: the choice of grammatical person used by the narrator to establish whether or not the narrator and the audience are participants in the story; also, this includes the scope of the information or knowledge that the narrator presents
 Narrative tense: the choice of either the past or present grammatical tense to establish either the prior completion or current immediacy of the plot
 Narrative technique: any of the various other methods chosen to help narrate a story, such as establishing the story's setting (location in time and space), developing characters, exploring themes (main ideas or topics), structuring the plot, intentionally expressing certain details but not others, following or subverting genre norms, and using various other storytelling devices and linguistic styles.

Thus, narration includes both who tells the story and how the story is told (for example, by using stream of consciousness or unreliable narration). The narrator may be anonymous and unspecified, or a character appearing and participating within their own story (whether fictitious or factual), or the author themself as a character. The narrator may merely relate the story to the audience without being involved in the plot and may have varied awareness of characters' thoughts and distant events. Some stories have multiple narrators to illustrate the storylines of various characters at various times, creating a story with a complex perspective.

Narrative point of view 
An ongoing debate has persisted regarding the nature of narrative point of view. A variety of different theoretical approaches have sought to define point of view in terms of person, perspective, voice, consciousness, and focus. Narrative perspective is the position and character of the storyteller, in relation to the narrative itself.

Literary theory
The Russian semiotician Boris Uspensky identifies five planes on which point of view is expressed in a narrative: 1) spatial, 2) temporal, 3) psychological, 4) phraseological, and 5) ideological.  The American literary critic Susan Sniader Lanser also develops these categories.

The temporal point of view can refer to narrative tense, or it can refer to how detailed or summarized the narration is. For example, when events are narrated after they have occurred (posterior narration), the narrator is in a privileged position to the characters in the story and can delve into the deeper significance of events and happenings, pointing out the missteps and missed meanings of the characters. The temporal point of view also focuses on the pace of the narration. The narrative pace can either be accelerated or slowed down. Narrative retardation (slowing down of narration) foregrounds events and suggests what is to be noticed by the reader, whereas summation or acceleration of narrative pace places events and happenings in the background, diminishing their importance.

The psychological point of view focuses on the characters' behaviors. Lanser concludes that this is "an extremely complex aspect of point of view, for it encompasses the broad question of the narrator's distance or affinity to each character and event…represented in the text."  Negative comments distance the reader from a character's point of view while positive evaluations create affinity with his or her perspective.

The phraseological point of view focuses on the speech characteristics of the characters and the narrator. For example, the names, titles, epithets, and sobriquets given to a character may evaluate a character's actions or speech and express a narrative point of view.

The ideological point of view is not only "the most basic aspect of point of view" but also the "least accessible to formalization, for its analysis relies to a degree, on intuitive understanding."  This aspect of the point of view focuses on the norms, values, beliefs, and Weltanschauung (worldview) of the narrator or a character. The ideological point of view may be stated outright—what Lanser calls "explicit ideology"—or it may be embedded at "deep-structural" levels of the text and not easily identified.

First-person 

A first-person point of view reveals the story through an openly self-referential and participating narrator. First person creates a close relationship between the narrator and reader, by referring to the viewpoint character with first person pronouns like I and me (as well as we and us, whenever the narrator is part of a larger group). That is, the narrator openly acknowledges their own existence. Frequently, the first-person narrator is the protagonist, whose inner thoughts are expressed to the audience, even if not to any of the other characters. A first person narrator with a limited perspective is not able to witness or understand all facets of any situation. Thus, a narrator with this perspective will not be able to report the circumstances fully and will leave the reader with a subjective record of the plot details. Additionally, this narrator's character could be pursuing a hidden agenda or may be struggling with mental or physical challenges that further hamper their ability to tell the reader the whole, accurate truth of events. This form includes temporary first-person narration as a story within a story, wherein a narrator or character observing the telling of a story by another is reproduced in full, temporarily and without interruption shifting narration to the speaker. The first-person narrator can also be the focal character. The viewpoint character is not necessarily the focal character: examples of supporting viewpoint characters include Doctor Watson, Scout in To Kill a Mockingbird, and Nick Carraway of The Great Gatsby.

Second-person 

The second-person point of view is a point of view where the audience is made a character. This is done with the use of second-person pronouns like you. The narrator could be literally addressing the audience, but more often the second-person referent of these stories is actually some character within the story. Novels in second person are comparatively rare; rather, this point of view tends to be mostly confined to songs and poems. Nevertheless, some notable examples include the novel Half Asleep in Frog Pajamas by Tom Robbins, If on a winter's night a traveler by Italo Calvino, the short fiction of Lorrie Moore and Junot Díaz, the short story The Egg by Andy Weir, and Second Thoughts by Michel Butor. Sections of N. K. Jemisin's The Fifth Season and its sequels are also narrated in the second person.
"You are not the kind of guy who would be at a place like this at this time of the morning. But here you are, and you cannot say that the terrain is entirely unfamiliar, although the details are fuzzy."—Opening lines of Jay McInerney's Bright Lights, Big City (1984)

Gamebooks, including the American Choose Your Own Adventure and British Fighting Fantasy series (the two largest examples of the genre), are written from the second-person perspective. Indeed, second-person narrative is a near-ubiquitous feature of the medium, regardless of the wide differences in target reading ages and role-playing game system complexity. Similarly, text-based interactive fiction, such as Colossal Cave Adventure and Zork, conventionally has descriptions written in the second person, telling the character what they are seeing and doing. This practice is also encountered occasionally in text-based segments of graphical games, such as those from Spiderweb Software, which make ample use of second person flavor text in pop up text boxes with character and location descriptions. Charles Stross's novel Halting State was written in second person as an allusion to this style.

Third-person 

In the third-person narrative mode, the narration refers to all characters with third person pronouns like he, she, or they, and never first- or second-person pronouns. This makes clear the narration is done without the need for a narrator who is identified and personified as a character within the story. For the purpose of comparison to stories that have a narrator, third-person narration is described as having an anonymous narrator.

Traditionally, third-person narration is the most commonly used narrative mode in literature. It does not require that the narrator's existence be explained or developed as a particular character, as would be the case with a first-person narrator. It thus allows a story to be told without detailing any information about the teller (narrator) of the story. Instead, a third-person narrator is often simply some disembodied commentary, rather than a fully developed character. Sometimes, third-person narration is called the "he/she" perspective, and, on even rarer occasions, author/omniscient point of view.

The third-person modes are usually categorized along two axes. The first is the subjectivity/objectivity axis, with third person subjective narration involving one or more characters' personal feelings and thoughts, and third person objective narration not describing the feelings or thoughts of any characters but, rather, just the exact facts of the story. Third-person modes may also be categorized along the omniscient/limited axis. A third person omniscient narrator conveys information from multiple characters, places, and events of the story, including any given character's thoughts, and a third person limited narrator conveys the knowledge and subjective experience of just one character. Third person narration, in both its limited and omniscient variants, became the most popular narrative perspective during the 20th century.

Omniscient or limited 
Omniscient point of view is presented by a narrator with an overarching perspective, seeing and knowing everything that happens within the world of the story, including what each of the characters is thinking and feeling. This narrative point of view has been the most commonly used in narrative writing; it is seen in countless classic novels, including works by Charles Dickens, Leo Tolstoy, and George Eliot. It sometimes even takes a subjective approach. One advantage of narrative omniscience is that it enhances the sense of objective reliability (that is, apparent truthfulness) of the plot, which may be important with more complex narratives. The third-person omniscient narrator is the least capable of being unreliable—although the character of omniscient narrator can have its own personality, offering judgments and opinions on the behavior of the story characters.

Many stories, especially in literature, alternate from one character to another at chapter boundaries, such as in the A Song of Ice and Fire series by George R. R. Martin. The Home and the World, written in 1916 by Rabindranath Tagore, is another example of a book switching among just three characters at chapter boundaries. In The Heroes of Olympus series, the point of view alternates between characters at intervals. The Harry Potter series focuses on the protagonist for much of the seven novels, but sometimes deviates to other characters, particularly in the opening chapters of later novels in the series, which switch from the view of the eponymous Harry to other characters (for example, the Muggle Prime Minister in the Half-Blood Prince).

Limited third-person point of view is used by an anonymous narrator who follows one character's perspective. This is the most common narrative point of view in literature since the early 20th century. Examples include the Harry Potter books and J.M. Coetzee's Disgrace.

Subjective or objective 
Subjective point of view is when the narrator conveys the thoughts, feelings, and opinions of one or more characters. If this is just one character, it can be termed third-person limited, in which the reader is limited to the thoughts of some particular character (often the protagonist) as in the first-person mode, except still giving personal descriptions using third-person pronouns. This is almost always the main character (for example, Gabriel in James Joyce's "The Dead", Nathaniel Hawthorne's Young Goodman Brown, or Santiago in Hemingway's The Old Man and the Sea). Certain third-person omniscient modes are also classifiable as using the third person, subjective mode when they switch between the thoughts and feelings of all the characters.

In contrast to the broad, sweeping perspectives seen in many 19th-century novels, third-person subjective is sometimes called the "over the shoulder" perspective; the narrator only describes events perceived and information known by a character. At its narrowest and most subjective scope, the story reads as though the viewpoint character were narrating it; dramatically this is very similar to the first person, in that it allows in-depth revelation of the protagonist's personality, but it uses third-person grammar. Some writers will shift perspective from one viewpoint character to another, such as in Robert Jordan's The Wheel of Time, or George R. R. Martin's A Song of Ice and Fire.

Free indirect speech is the presentation of a character's thoughts in the voice of the third-person narrator.

Objective point of view employs a narrator who tells a story without describing any character's thoughts, opinions, or feelings; instead, it gives an objective, unbiased point of view. Often the narrator is self-dehumanized in order to make the narrative more neutral. This type of narrative mode is often seen outside of fiction in newspaper articles, biographical documents, and scientific journals. This narrative mode can be described as a "fly-on-the-wall" or "camera lens" approach that can only record the observable actions but does not interpret these actions or relay what thoughts are going through the minds of the characters. Works of fiction that use this style emphasize characters acting out their feelings observably. Internal thoughts, if expressed, are given through an aside or soliloquy. While this approach does not allow the author to reveal the unexpressed thoughts and feelings of the characters, it does allow the author to reveal information that not all or any of the characters may be aware of. An example of this so-called camera-eye perspective is "Hills Like White Elephants" by Ernest Hemingway.

This narrative mode is also called third-person dramatic because the narrator, like the audience of a drama, is neutral and ineffective toward the progression of the plot—merely an uninvolved onlooker.

Alternating person 
While the tendency for novels (or other narrative works) is to adopt a single point of view throughout the entire novel, some authors have utilized other points of view that, for example, alternate between different first-person narrators or alternate between a first- and a third-person narrative mode. The ten books of the Pendragon adventure series, by D. J. MacHale, switch back and forth between a first-person perspective (handwritten journal entries) of the main character along his journey as well as a disembodied third-person perspective focused on his friends back home. Margaret Atwood's Alias Grace provides one character's viewpoint from first-person as well as another character's from third-person limited. Often, a narrator using the first person will try to be more objective by also employing the third person for important action scenes, especially those in which they are not directly involved or in scenes where they are not present to have viewed the events in firsthand. This mode is found in Barbara Kingsolver's The Poisonwood Bible. In William Faulkner's As I Lay Dying, even the perspective of a deceased person is included.

Audrey Niffenegger's The Time Traveler's Wife alternates between an art student named Clare, and a librarian named Henry. John Green and David Levithan's novel Will Grayson, Will Grayson rotates between two boys both named Will Grayson. It alternates between both boys telling their part of the story, how they meet and how their lives then come together. Nick Hornby's A Long Way Down has four narrators, who also are its main characters. These four characters meet at the top of a tall building known as "the suicide spot" and begin to talk instead of jumping. They then form a group and continue to meet up.  K.A. Applegate's Animorphs series contains four special-edition books, the Megamorphs books, in which narration alternates among the six main characters, Jake, Rachel, Tobias, Cassie, Marco, and Ax.

My Name Is Red and Silent House by Orhan Pamuk have alternating first-person narrators. Sometimes even animals, plants, and objects narrate.

Narrative tense
In narrative past tense, the events of the plot occur before the narrator's present. This is by far the most common tense in which stories are expressed. This could be in the narrator's distant past or their immediate past, which for practical purposes is the same as their present. Past tense can be used regardless of whether the setting is in the reader's past, present, or future.

In narratives using present tense, the events of the plot are depicted as occurring in the narrator's current moment of time. A recent example of novels narrated in the present tense are those of the Hunger Games trilogy by Suzanne Collins. Present tense can also be used to narrate events in the reader's past. This is known as "historical present". This tense is more common in spontaneous conversational narratives than in written literature, though it is sometimes used in literature to give a sense of immediacy of the actions.

The future tense is the most rare, portraying the events of the plot as occurring some time after the narrator's present. Often, these upcoming events are described such that the narrator has foreknowledge (or supposed foreknowledge) of their future, so many future-tense stories have a prophetic tone. An example being Story of Your Life by Ted Chiang.

Narrative technique

Stream-of-consciousness 

Stream of consciousness gives the (typically first-person) narrator's perspective by attempting to replicate the thought processes—as opposed to simply the actions and spoken words—of the narrative character. Often, interior monologues and inner desires or motivations, as well as pieces of incomplete thoughts, are expressed to the audience but not necessarily to other characters. Examples include the multiple narrators' feelings in William Faulkner's The Sound and the Fury and As I Lay Dying, and the character Offred's often fragmented thoughts in Margaret Atwood's The Handmaid's Tale. Irish writer James Joyce exemplifies this style in his novel Ulysses.

Unreliable narrator 

Unreliable narration involves the use of an untrustworthy narrator. This mode may be employed to give the audience a deliberate sense of disbelief in the story or a level of suspicion or mystery as to what information is meant to be true and what is meant to be false. Unreliable narrators are usually first-person narrators; however, a third-person narrator may be unreliable. An example is J.D. Salinger's The Catcher in the Rye, in which the novel's narrator Holden Caulfield is biased, emotional, and juvenile, divulging or withholding certain information deliberately and at times probably quite unreliable.

See also 
 Narrative structure
 Opening narration
 Pace

Notes

Further reading 
 
 
 
 Genette, Gérard. Narrative Discourse. An Essay in Method. Transl. by Jane Lewin. Oxford: Blackwell 1980 (Translation of Discours du récit).
 Stanzel, Franz Karl. A theory of Narrative. Transl. by Charlotte Goedsche. Cambridge: CUP 1984 (Transl. of Theorie des Erzählens).

Fiction
Style (fiction)
Point of view
Narratology
Literary concepts
Descriptive technique